Melvin Herbert King (born 20 October 1928) is an American politician, community organizer, and educator, who holds the position of Senior Lecturer Emeritus at the Massachusetts Institute of Technology in their Department of Urban Studies and Planning. In 1973, King was elected as a member of the Massachusetts House of Representatives' 9th Suffolk district, a post he held until early 1983. King was the runner-up in the 1983 Boston mayoral election, against Raymond Flynn.

King, a lifelong resident of South End neighborhood of Boston, has been active in creating community programs and institutions for low-income people in the city, and he is the founder and current director of the South End Technology Center.

Early years
King's mother, Ursula, was born in Guyana, and his father, Watts King, in Barbados. His parents met and married in Nova Scotia and immigrated to Boston in the early 1920s. Born in the South End neighborhood, King was one of eleven children, only nine of whom survived past infancy. He graduated from Boston Technical High School in 1946 and then from Claflin College in Orangeburg, South Carolina in 1950 with a Bachelor of Science degree in mathematics. In 1951, he received a Master of Arts degree in education from Boston State College, and then taught math, first at Boston Trade High School and at his alma mater, Boston Technical High School.

In 1953, King left the classroom to work with at-risk students, becoming Director of Boy's Work at Lincoln House, a settlement house in the South End. He continued doing community work, focusing on street-corner gangs as Youth Director at the United South End Settlements (USES). King also worked as a community activist, as well as an urban renewal and anti-poverty organizer. He was fired by USES when he promoted neighborhood control over government control, but was later rehired after community protests over his firing and was given the job of community organizer. King then founded the Community Assembly for a United South End (C.A.U.S.E.) to give tenants and community residents a voice.

Political activities

Activism
In 1967, King became the director of the New Urban League of Greater Boston.  He brought job training for the unemployed and organized the community around public school, employment, and human services delivery issues. In 2003, King created The New Majority – an organization and program uniting Boston's communities of color– Blacks, Hispanics, Asians, and Native Americans – uniting them around candidates for elective office.

Boston Redevelopment Authority protests and Tent City
In 1968 Mel King helped organize a sit-in at the Boston Redevelopment Authority (BRA) office on Thursday, April 25, 1968 in protest of a planned parking garage that was going to be built at the corner of Dartmouth and Columbus Streets in the South End, a site where housing had been leveled.  The next morning, Mel King organized an occupation of the lot.

While facing police retaliation, for the next three days between 100 and 400 people occupied the lot. They built tents and wooden shanties and put up a large sign welcoming the media and visitors to "Tent City." Celtics legend Bill Russell, who owned a South End restaurant, provided food for the protestors. The story received extensive coverage in the local media. In honor of the demonstration, when a housing complex at that site was dedicated on April 30, 1988, it was named "Tent City." Mel King told reporters that the key to the project was convincing ordinary Bostonians that they had to play a role in the development of their neighborhood.

Boston School Committee campaigns
King ran three times for a seat on the Boston School Committee in 1961, 1963, and 1965 – being unsuccessful each time.

State Representative
In 1973, he was elected as a State Representative for the 4th Suffolk district and served in the Massachusetts Legislature until 1982. He was redistricted to the 9th Suffolk district in 1978.

1983 mayoral campaign

In 1983, when the incumbent Mayor of Boston, Kevin White, withdrew from contention after 16 years in office, Mel King ran for mayor, the first African-American to run in a final election bid for mayor of Boston, and ultimately against Raymond Flynn. Though King secured the African American vote by wide margins and significant support among other ethnic groups, King ultimately lost to Flynn, an Irish-Catholic with roots in South Boston.

Both King and Flynn had originally been viewed as underdogs in the primary election. King's campaign relied heavily on volunteers, as did the campaign of Flynn. King's campaign came in a year where Black candidates in other cities had enjoyed success. This included the election of Harold Washington in Chicago.

Rainbow Coalition/Green–Rainbow Party
King founded the Rainbow Coalition Party in Massachusetts. The term "rainbow coalition" had been used to describe coalitions which brought together a variety of demographic groups (including multiple ethnicities) into a political coalition. King had used it to describe his coalition of support during his 1983 mayoral campaign, preceding the Jesse Jackson presidential campaign the next year. In 2002, the Rainbow Coalition Party merged with the Massachusetts Green Party to become the Green-Rainbow Party, the Massachusetts affiliate of the Green Party of the United States.

In 2002, King supported Green-Rainbow Party nominee Jill Stein for governor of Massachusetts, saying "Jill Stein is the only candidate who will speak truth to power...She's the only one that makes issues of racism and social justice integral parts of her campaign.

King remains active as a member of the Green-Rainbow Party. In 2014 he was the Campaign Manager for the Green-Rainbow Party candidate for State Auditor, M.K. Merelice and also supported the candidacies of Green-Rainbow Party candidate for Secretary of State Danny Factor and Green-Rainbow Party candidate for Treasurer Ian Jackson.

Endorsements of candidacies
During the 2000 presidential election King endorsed the presidential campaign of Ralph Nader

King endorsed at-large city-councilor Sam Yoon for Mayor on August 10, 2009. King praised Yoon's vision, his collaborative approach and his focus on improving the educational system in Boston.

King gave a last-minute endorsement to Acting Mayor Kim Janey before the primary of the 2021 Boston mayoral election.

The Mel King Institute
The Mel King Institute for Community Building was formed in 2009 by the Massachusetts Association of Community Development Corporations (MACDC) and Local Initiatives Support Corporation (LISC) Boston, a nonprofit that supports affordable housing and community development. It is a training center and information clearinghouse for community development practitioners.

Academic work
In 1970, King created the Community Fellows Program (CFP) in the Department of Urban Studies and Planning at MIT. He served as an Adjunct Professor of Urban Studies and Planning and director of the Community Fellows Program for twenty-five years until 1996. CFP, a nine-month-long program brought community organizers and leaders from across America to reflect, research, and study urban community politics, economics, social life, education, housing, and media.

In 1981, King's book, Chain of Change: Struggles for Black Community Development was published by South End Press. It focused on development in housing, education, employment and politics in Boston from the 1950s through the 1970s. Inspired by young activists, King reprints ‘Chain of Change’ in 2018.

Upon his retirement from MIT, King established (in the Tent City context of Boston's Back Bay) the South End Technology Center to provide computer training for low-income people.

In addition to writing Chain of Change and journal articles, King has used poetry to share his messages.

Works
King, Melvin, Chain of Change: Struggles for Black Community Development, South End Press, 1981.

See also
 1973–1974 Massachusetts legislature
 1975–1976 Massachusetts legislature

References

External links
MassMoments: "Activists Erect Tent City in Boston"
Boston Phoenix: "Still going strong at 75, former Boston mayoral candidate Mel King reflects on a life of political activism"
Interview with Mel King about living in a diverse city for the WGBH series, Ten O'Clock News
"WGBH: Gail Harris interviews Mel King"
Time Magazine: "Boston wins by a landslide .. a black takes the primary in a racially scarred city"
Dorchester Reporter: "The Campaign that changed Boston: 1983"
MIT News Office: "Conference to Honor Mel King"
South End Technology Center@Tent City
The New Majority: Uniting Boston's Communities of Color
Historymakers Profile: Hon. Melvin King

1928 births
Living people
American people of Guyanese descent
American people of Barbadian descent
American urban planners
Activists for African-American civil rights
African-American state legislators in Massachusetts
Boston State College alumni
Claflin University alumni
University of Massachusetts Boston alumni
Members of the Massachusetts House of Representatives
Massachusetts Greens
People from South End, Boston
MIT School of Architecture and Planning faculty
Writers from Boston
Politicians from Boston
21st-century African-American politicians
21st-century American politicians